Comanche County is the name of three counties in the United States:

 Comanche County, Kansas 
 Comanche County, Oklahoma 
 Comanche County, Texas